HNLMS Tjerk Hiddes (F804) was a frigate of the . The ship was in service with the Royal Netherlands Navy from 1967 to 1986. The ship's radio call sign was "PAVC". She was sold to the Indonesian Navy where the ship was renamed KRI Ahmad Yani (351).

Design and construction
In the early 1960s, the Royal Netherlands Navy had an urgent requirement to replace its s, obsolete ex-American escorts built during the Second World War. To meet this requirement, it chose to build a modified version of the British  as its , using broadly the same armament as the original design, but where possible, substituting Dutch electronics and radars.

Displacement was  standard and  full load.

A twin 4.5-inch (113 mm) Mark 6 gun mount was fitted forward. Anti-aircraft defence was provided by two quadruple Sea Cat surface-to-air missile launchers on the hangar roof. A Limbo anti-submarine mortar was fitted aft to provide a short-range anti-submarine capability, while a hangar and  helicopter deck allowed a single Westland Wasp helicopter to be operated, for longer range anti-submarine and anti-surface operations.

As built, Tjerk Hiddes was fitted with a Signaal LW-03 long range air search radar on the ship's mainmast, with a DA02 medium range air/surface surveillance radar carried on the ship's foremast. M44 and M45 fire control radars were provided for the Seacat missiles and ships guns respectively. The ship had a sonar suite of Type 170B attack sonar and Type 162 bottom search sonar. The ship had a crew of 251.

Modifications
All six Van Speijks were modernised in the 1970s, using many of the systems used by the new s. The 4.5-inch gun was replaced by a single OTO Melara 76 mm and launchers for up to eight Harpoon anti-ship missiles fitted (although only two were normally carried). The hangar and flight deck were enlarged, allowing a Westland Lynx helicopter to be carried, while the Limbo mortar was removed, with a pair of triple Mk 32 torpedo launchers providing close-in anti-submarine armament. A Signaal DA03 radar replaced the DA02 radar and an American EDO Corporation CWE-610 sonar replaced the original British sonar. Tjerk Hiddes was modernised at the Den Helder naval dockyard between 15 December 1978 and 1 June 1981.

Dutch service history
An order for four Van Speijks, including Tjerk Hiddes, was placed in 1962, with two more ordered in 1964. Tjerk Hiddes was laid down at the Amsterdam shipyard of Nederlandsche Dok en Scheepsbouw Maatschappij on 1 June 1964 and was launched  on 17 December 1965. The ship was completed and entered service on 16 August 1967 with the pennant number F804.

In 1969 Tjerk Hiddes participated in the NATO exercises Razor Sharp and Peace Keeper and also served with STANAVFORLANT.

On 27 August 1978 she was present at the Navy days at Portsmouth.

The four ships then were purchased by Indonesia. Tjerk Hiddes was decommissioned on 6 January 1986 and transferred to the Indonesian Navy on 31 October 1986.

Indonesian service history
On 11 February 1986, Indonesia and the Netherlands signed an agreement for transfer of two Van Speijk class with option on two more ships. The ship was transferred to Indonesia on 31 October 1986 and renamed KRI Ahmad Yani on joining the Indonesian Navy, with the pennant number 351.

By 2002, the ships Seacat missiles were inoperable and it was reported that propulsion problems were badly effecting the availability of the ships of this class. The ship's Seacat launchers were therefore replaced by two Simbad twin launchers for Mistral anti-aircraft missiles, and Ahmad Yani was re-engined with two  Caterpiller 3616 diesel engines. As the Indonesian Navy retired Harpoon missile from its stockpiles, Ahmad Yani was rearmed with Chinese C-802 missiles.

Notes

References

 

 

Van Speijk-class frigates
1965 ships
Ships built in Amsterdam